Strip is the first acoustic album and fourth studio album overall by English rock band the Chameleons. It was released 1 May 2000 on record label Paradiso, following the band's reformation that year. It consists of acoustic arrangements of the Chameleons' previously released songs.

Release 
Strip was released 1 May 2000 on record label Paradiso.

Critical reception 

AllMusic wrote that the album "[doesn't] so much retread its golden oldies for the umpteenth time as recast them completely as modern ideas".

Track listing

Personnel 
 The Chameleons

 Mark Burgess – bass, vocals, 12-string guitar
 Reg Smithies – guitars, acoustic guitar, 12-string guitar, percussion
 Dave Fielding – acoustic guitar, 12-string guitar, harmonica, didgeridoo

 Technical

 The Chameleons – production
 Mark Burgess – liner notes
 Jonathan Barrett – production, engineering
 Shan Hira – production, engineering
 Nimbus – mastering
 Reg Smithies – sleeve artwork

References

External links 

 Liner notes
 

2000 albums
The Chameleons albums